Oh Carol is a 1970 compilation album consisting of some of the best-known works of American pop singer Neil Sedaka. It was released in Great Britain and throughout Europe on the RCA International label.

Track listing
Side one
"Oh Carol!"		
"Next Door to an Angel"		
"King of Clowns"
"Happy Birthday Sweet Sixteen"		
"Stairway to Heaven"		
"Breaking Up Is Hard to Do"

Side two
"One-Way Ticket (To The Blues)"		
"Calendar Girl"		
"Little Devil"		
"Sweet Little You"		
"Run Samson Run"		
"You Mean Everything to Me"

Other releases
In West Germany, this album was released on the RCA International label as part of a series of LPs, "Yesterday's Pop Scene".

In Italy, this album was released in 1975 on the RCA Lineatre label under the title "Neil Sedaka: Greatest Hits".

1970 compilation albums
Neil Sedaka compilation albums
RCA Records compilation albums